B roads are numbered routes in Great Britain of lesser importance than A roads. See the article Great Britain road numbering scheme for the rationale behind the numbers allocated.

Zone 6 (3 digits)

Zone 6 (4 digits)

References

6
 6